Silia Logotheti (born 4 October 1998) is a Greek female water polo player. She plays for Olympiacos in Greece. She was part of the Greece women's team winning the bronze medal at the 2015 European Games in Baku.

References

External links
 at Baku 2015

1998 births
Living people
Greek female water polo players
Olympiacos Women's Water Polo Team players
Water polo players from Athens
Water polo players at the 2015 European Games
European Games bronze medalists for Greece
European Games medalists in water polo
21st-century Greek women